Mr. & Miss Akuapem  is an annual unisex pageantry that educate Ghanaians and the global community about the various cultural values and heritage of the Akuapem people in the Eastern region of Ghana. The aim of the pageant is to promote development through culture and unity.

Overview 
The pageant seeks to bring unity among all the 17 states of Akuapem, unifying, maintaining and projecting the cultural values and again serve as a platform to showcase the talents in Akuapem. Two contestants are chosen from each Akuapem state to represent their various states. The 17 states are;

 Brekuso
 Aburi
 Ahwerase
 Obosomase
 Tutu
 Mampong
 Abotakyi
 Amanokrom
 Mamfe
 Larteh
 Akropong
 Abiriw
 Dawu
 Awukugua
 Adukrom
 Apirede
 Aseseeso/Abonse

Launch and Durbar to unveil contestants 
The paegent was officially launched at the Palm Hill Hotel, Akropong Akuapem in June 2021 and unveiled the contestants in Adukrom with the permission from the Office of the Okuapehene led by Oseadeeyo Kwasi Akuffo III.

Gallery

References

External links 
 A Grand Durbar For The Contestants of Mr & Miss Akuapem
Official theme song for Mr & Miss Akuapem.

Annual events in Ghana
Cultural festivals in Ghana